Eastern Suburbs (now known as the Sydney Roosters) competed in the 14th New South Wales Rugby League (NSWRL) premiership in 1921.

Details
 Home Ground: Agricultural Ground
 Line ups:-

Results
In 1921 there was only one round of matches played!

Premiership Round 1, bye.
Premiership Round 2, Saturday 30 April 1921;
Eastern Suburbs 32( 6 Tries; 7 Goals) defeated South Sydney 8( Funnell, McGrath Tries; Oxford Goal) at the Sydney Cricket Ground.
 Premiership Round 3, Saturday 7 May 1921;
Eastern Suburbs 30 (Tries 6; Goals 6) defeated Newtown 5(Try; Goal) at Sydney Cricket Ground. 		
This was reported to be a particularly wild match, reporter for the Sun newspaper, Claude Corbett, wrote "The first half was one of the wildest exhibitions of football I have ever seen. Newtown was solely responsible. There were times when a dozen players were tossing about in a heap, tearing and reefing at each other. Fists and feet flew on occasions and it was a miracle that no one was hurt.
	
 Premiership Round 4, Saturday 14 May 1921;
Eastern Suburbs 23( Tries 5; Goals 4) defeated St George 11(Try; Goals 3; Field Goal) at the Sydney Cricket Ground No.2.
This was the first meeting of the two clubs.

Premiership Round 5, Saturday 21 May;
Eastern Suburbs 8( Norman 4 Goals) drew with North Sydney 8( Blinkhorn, Green Tries; Thompson Goal) at Sydney Cricket Ground.	
 Described as the match of the season, Premiers, North Sydney, and eventual runners up Eastern Suburbs drew their match 8-all. The win, with no final played that year, virtually assured Norths of their 1st premiership. The official attendance was 44,818, but thousands more scaled the surrounding fences and walls - It was the largest crowd seen at a club match and remained so until the 1940s. A last gasp try by North’s George Green, just as Easts forward Jack 'Bluey' Watkins nailed him right on the corner flag, secured the draw for Norths.  

 Premiership Round 6, Saturday 28 May 1921;
Balmain 14(Tries 2; Goals 4) defeated Eastern Suburbs 8(Tries 2; Goal) at Sydney Sports Ground.
 Premiership Round 7, ??? 11 June;
Eastern Suburbs 19 (Tries 5; Goals 2) defeated Glebe 3(Tries) at the Sydney Cricket Ground.
 Premiership Round 8, ??? 18 June;
Eastern Suburbs 55(Rex Norman 3, + 10 Tries; Rex Norman 8 Goals) defeated University 11 (Tries 3; Goal) at the Sydney Cricket Ground.
 Premiership Round 9, Saturday 25 June 1921;
Eastern Suburbs 12( Tries 2; Goals 3) defeated Western Suburbs 7( Try; Goals 2) at Pratten Park.

Ladder

Season highlights

 Eastern Suburbs were defeated by South Sydney 21-10 in the final of that year's City Cup.
Rex Norman Was the New South Wales Rugby League's leading pointscorer.
Gordon Wright was the New South Wales Rugby League's leading try scorer for the 3rd year running.
 Sid 'Sandy' Pearce, the last remaining member of Eastern suburbs original 1908 team, retired after breaking his leg on that year's 'Kangaroo Tour'.
 Representatives: Rex Norman(NSW), Bill Ives(NSW), Ed Rigney(NSW), Sid 'Sandy' Pearce (Australia)

References

Sydney Roosters seasons
East